Marcellus is a masculine given name and a surname, which comes from the Roman god of war Mars.

Given name
Notable people with the name include:
Marcellus, character in William Shakespeare's tragic play Hamlet
Marcus Claudius Marcellus (42–23 B.C.), nephew of Augustus
 Marcus Claudius Marcellus (fl. 3rd century B.C.), Roman consul and military leader
 Claudii Marcelli, any men from his clan branch of gens Claudia
 Marcellus (magister equitum) (4th century), General in Gaul appointed by Constantuis II
 Marcellus (brother of Justin II) (fl. late 6th century), Byzantine aristocrat and general
 Marcellus (comes excubitorum) (fl. 6th century), commander of the Excubitors
 Marcellus (general under Justinian I) (fl. 530s), Byzantine general
 Marcellus (usurper) (died 366), Roman general
 Marcellus (prefect of Judea) (fl. 30s), mentioned in Josephus
 Marcellus of Ancyra (died c. 374), bishop
 Marcellus Bailey (1840–1921), American patent attorney
 Marcellus Flemming Berry, inventor
 Marcellus Boss (1901–1967), Governor of Guam
 Marcellus Bowman (born 1988), Canadian football player
 Frank Marcellus Boyce (1851–1931), American physician
 Marcellus of Capua (fl. 3rd or 4th century), martyr
 Alonzo Marcellus Carroll (1894–1962), American football player
 Marcellus H. Chiles (1895–1918), American Army soldier and Medal of Honor recipient
 Cassius Marcellus Clay (disambiguation)
 Marcellus Jerome Clarke (1844–1865), American Civil War soldier and guerrilla
 Marcellus Coffermans (1520–1578), Flemish painter
 Cassius Marcellus Coolidge (1844–1934), American artist
 Marcellus M. Crocker (1830–1865), American Civil War general
 Marcellus Hartley Dodge (disambiguation)
 Marcellus Dorwin (1861–1925), American politician
 Marcellus Douglass (died 1862), American Civil War soldier
 Marcellus Gilmore Edson (1849–1940), Canadian inventor
 Marcellus Emants (1848–1923), Dutch novelist
 Marcellus Empiricus (fl. late 4th and early 5th centuries), Latin medical writer
 Marcellus, Archbishop of Esztergom (fl. 1095–1124)
 Marcellus Gallio, character in the Lloyd C. Douglas novel The Robe
 Marcellus Gomes (born 1961), Indian field hockey player
 William Marcellus Goodrich (1777–1833), American organ builder
 Marcellus Greene (born 1957), American football player
 Marcellus Hall, American artist and musician
 Marcellus Hartley (1827–1902), American arms dealer
 Nicholas Marcellus Hentz (1797–1856), French-American educator
 William Marcellus Howard (1857–1932), American politician
 John Marcellus Huston (1906–1987), American film director
 Marcellus Jones (1830–1900), American Civil War soldier
 Marcellus L. Joslyn (1873–1963), American businessman
 James Marcellus Kendrick (1893–1941), American football player
 George Marcellus Landers (1813–1895), American politician
 Marcellus Laroon (1653–1702), Dutch painter
 Marcellus Laroon the Younger (1679–1772), English painter
 Laurence Marcellus Larson (1868–1938), Norwegian-born American educator
 Joseph Marcellus McWhorter (1828–1913), American lawyer
 Nathan Marcellus Moore (born 1965), English musician
 Marcellus Deming Nave (born 1880; death date unknown), American college football coach
 Marcellus Neal (1868–1939), first African-American graduate of Indiana University
 Marcellus de Niveriis (died 1460 or 1462), German Franciscan
 Marcellus Orontius (fl. 3rd century), neoplatonist and disciple of Plotinus
 John Marcellus Richter (1873–1927), American baseball player
 Marcellus Rivers (born 1978), American football player
 Marcellus of Side (fl. 2nd century), Greek poet
 Marcellus Stearns (1839–1891), American politician
 Robert Marcellus Stewart (1815–1871), Governor of Missouri
 Marcellus Augustus Stovall (1818–1895), American Civil War soldier
 Marcellus of Tangier (c. mid 3rd century – 298), martyr
 Marsellus Wallace, a character in the movie Pulp Fiction
 Cadmus Marcellus Wilcox (1824–1890), American Civil War general
 Marcellus Wiley (born 1974), American football player
 Cal Marcellus Young (1871–1957), American college football coach
 Marcus Claudius Marcellus Aeserninus, any of several members of the gens Claudia
 Pope Marcellus (disambiguation)
 Pseudo-Marcellus, author of the Passio sanctorum Petri et Pauli

Surname
 Abercius Marcellus (died c. 167), Roman bishop
 Gaius Claudius Marcellus (disambiguation)
 Granius Marcellus (fl. 15), Roman politician
 John Marcellus, American musician
 John Plummer Marcellus (1838–1932), Canadian politician
 Lucius Neratius Marcellus (fl. 1st and 2nd century), Roman consul
 Marcus Asinius Marcellus (fl. 1st century), Roman consul
 Marcus Claudius Marcellus (disambiguation)
 Marcus Vitorius Marcellus (c. 60 - after 105), Roman politician
 Nawoon Marcellus, Haitian politician
 Nonius Marcellus (fl. 4th or 5th century), Roman grammarian
 Robert Marcellus (1928–1996), American classical clarinetist
 Sextus Varius Marcellus (c. 165 – c. 215), Roman politician
 Titus Clodius Eprius Marcellus (died 79), Roman politician
 Ulpius Marcellus (fl. 2nd Century), Roman governor and general
 Ulpius Marcellus (son) (fl. 211–212), latest-recorded governor of Britannia

Variants 
 Marcus 
Martin
Mario
Marianus

See also
Marcel, given name
Marsalis, surname
Marselis, surname

Surnames from given names